The 2005 Wilkes-Barre/Scranton Pioneers season was the team's fifth season as a member of the af2 and the second under head coach Les Moss.  The team ended with a 9–7 record and qualified for the playoffs, but the Pioneers fell to the Florida Firecats for the second straight year.  Following the season, Moss left the team to be an assistant coach with the Orlando Predators, leaving the team looking for its fifth head coach for its fifth season.

Schedule

Regular season

Postseason

Final standings

Attendance

External links
ArenaFan Online 2005 Wilkes-Barre/Pioneers schedule
ArenaFan Online 2005 af2 standings
ArenaFan Online 2005 af2 attendance

Wilkes-Barre/Scranton Pioneers seasons
Wilkes-Barre Scranton Pioneers
2005 in American football